Sasanian Armenia, also known as Persian Armenia and Persarmenia ( – Parskahayastan), may either refer to the periods in which Armenia ( – Armin) was under the suzerainty of the Sasanian Empire or specifically to the parts of Armenia under its control such as after the partition of 387 when parts of western Armenia were incorporated into the Eastern Roman Empire while the rest of Armenia came under Sasanian suzerainty but maintained its existing kingdom until 428.

In 428, Armenian nobles petitioned Bahram V to depose Artaxias IV (r. 422); Bahram V (r. 420–438) abolished the Kingdom of Armenia and appointed Veh Mihr Shapur as marzban (governor of a frontier province, "margrave") of the country, which marked the start of a new era known as the Marzpanate period ( – Marzpanakan Hayastan), a period when marzbans, nominated by the Sasanian emperor, governed eastern Armenia, as opposed to the western Byzantine Armenia which was ruled by several princes, and later governors, under Byzantine suzerainty. The Marzpanate period ended with the Arab conquest of Armenia in the 7th century, when the Principality of Armenia was established. An estimated 3,000,000 Armenians were under the influence of the Sasanian marzpans during this period.

The marzban was invested with supreme power, even imposing death sentences; but he could not interfere with the age-long privileges of the Armenian nakharars. The country as a whole enjoyed considerable autonomy. The office of Hazarapet, corresponding to that of Minister of the Interior, public works and finance, was mostly entrusted to an Armenian, while the post of Sparapet (commander-in-chief) was entrusted only to an Armenian. Each nakharar had his own army, according to the extent of his domain. The "National Cavalry", or "Royal Force", was under the commander-in-chief. The tax collectors were all Armenians. The courts of justice and the schools were directed by the Armenian clergy. Several times, an Armenian nakharar became marzpan, as did Vahan Mamikonian in 485 after a period of rebellion against the Iranians.

Three times during the Marzpanic period, Iranian kings launched persecutions against Christianity in Armenia. The Iranians had tolerated the invention of the Armenian alphabet and the founding of schools, which they thought would encourage the spiritual separation of Armenia from the Byzantines, but on the contrary, the new cultural movement among the Armenians proved to be conducive to closer relations with Byzantium.

Background
Christianity became the state religion of Armenia in 301. In 387, Armenia was divided between the Sasanian Empire and the Eastern Roman Empire. The former established control in Eastern Armenia after the fall of the Arshakuni Armenian Kingdom in 428.

History

Marzbanate (428–646)
In 428, Armenian nobles, nakharar, dissatisfied with the rule of Artaxias IV petitioned emperor Bahram V to depose him. Bahram V abolished the Kingdom of Armenia and appointed Veh Mihr Shapur as marzban (governor of a frontier province, "margrave") of the country.

In 465, Adhur Gushnasp was appointed by the Sasanian emperor Peroz I (r. 459–484) as the marzban of Armenia, replacing Adhur Hormizd. In 475, the Mamikonian princess Shushanik, was murdered by her husband Prince Varsken, a recent convert to Zoroastrianism, because she refused to convert and wanted to stay Christian. Varsken was then executed by Vakhtang I, king of Iberia.

Peroz I, eager to avenge Varsken, sent his general Shapur Mihran to Iberia. Vakhtang then appealed to the Huns and the Armenian nobles, citing solidarity between Christians. After carefully weighing the decision, the Mamikonian prince Vahan Mamikonian agreed to revolt against the Sasanians. He defeated and killed Adhur Gushnasp, and thereafter declared Sahak II Bagratuni as the new marzban. He also kept repelling several Sasanian counter-attacks.

In 482, Shapur Mihran began to become a big threat to the security of Iberia, which made Vakhtang request Armenian aid. Vahan and Sahak shortly arrived to Iberia at the head of a big army, but were defeated in Akesga, where Sahak was killed. Vahan fled with the remnants of the Armenian army into the mountains, where he led guerrilla actions against the Sasanians, while Shapur Mihran managed to regain control of Armenia. However, Shapur Mihran was shortly ordered to return to the Sasanian capital of Ctesiphon. Vahan quickly used the opportunity to regain control of Armenia.

In the spring of 484, however, Shapur Mihran returned as the head of a new army and forced Vahan to flee to refuge near the Byzantine frontier, at Tao and Taron. During the same period, the Sasanian noble Zarmihr Karen from the Karenid family, was successful in another campaign against the Armenians, and managed to capture several of them, including noblemen from the Kamsarakan family. Zarmihr shortly delivered the Armenian captives to Shapur Mihran, who delivered them to Izad Gushnasp, promising the Armenian captives to make Peroz spare them.

However, an unexpected event changed the course of events: the death of the Sasanian king Peroz I in 484 in war against the Hephthalites, causing the withdrawal of the Sasanians in Armenia and recovery of Dvin and Vagharshapat. Struggling to suppress the revolt of his brother Zarir, Peroz's successor, Balash (r. 484-488), needed the help of the Armenians: in exchange for military support, he agreed to sign the Nvarsak Treaty, which granted religious freedom to the Christians and the prohibition of Zoroastrianism in Armenia, including much greater autonomy for the nakharar. Vahan was also recognized as sparapet and the property of the Mamikonian family and its allies were returned.

Between 515-516, several Hunnic tribes kept making incursions into Armenia—the Armenian nobleman Mjej I Gnuni then decided to organize a counter-attack, where he successfully managed to repel them. As a reward, Kavadh I appointed him as the marzban of Armenia in 518. During this governorship, Mjej maintained religious peace. In 527, he repelled several other Hunnic invasions. In 548, he was succeeded by Gushnasp Bahram.

Chihor-Vishnasp, a member of the Suren family and a relative of Khosrow I himself, was in 564 appointed as marzban. During this period, the Armenian aristocracy was split between two parties, the national one which was headed by a member of the Mamikonian family, and a pro-Sasanian one, which was headed by a member of the Siunia family.

Chihor Vishnasp harshly treated the Christian Armenians who were suspected of secretly siding with the Byzantines, and he also did the same with the rest of the Christian Armenian population. Claiming to exploit on the command of the king, he persecuted the Christian Armenians and even built a fire-temple in Dvin. These actions soon resulted in a massive uprising in late 571 or early 572, which was led by Vardan III Mamikonian. On 23 February 572, the Armenian rebels seized Dvin, and had Chihor-Vishnasp killed.

Vardan Mamikonian 
Sasanian king Yazdegerd II began to view Christianity in the Northern lands as a political threat to the cohesiveness of the Iranian empire. The dispute appears to be based on Iranian military considerations of the time given that according to Acts 2:9 in the Acts of the Apostles there were Persians, Parthians and Medes (all Iranian tribes) among the first new Christian converts at Pentecost and Christianity has had a long history in Iran as a minority religion, dating back to the very early years of the faith. Nevertheless, the conversion to Christianity by Armenians in the North was of particular concern to Yazdegerd II.  After a successful invasion of the Eastern Roman Empire, Yazdegerd began summoning Armenian nobles to Ctesiphon and reconverted them to Zoroastrianism (a faith many Armenians shared with Iranians prior to Christianity). This upset the Armenian population, and under the leadership of Vardan Mamikonian an army of 66,000 Armenians rebelled against the Sasanian empire. Yazdegerd quickly subdued the rebellion at the Battle of Avarayr.

Nvarsak Treaty 
The military success of the Iranians ensured that Armenia would remain part of the Sasanian empire for centuries to come. However, Armenian objections did not end until the Nvarsak Treaty, which guaranteed Armenia more freedom and freedom of religion (Christianity) under Sasanian rule.

Sasanian coins produced in Armenia 
Sasanian government had produced gold, silver and bronze coins in Armenia. 813 of these coins were found in 34 regions in Armenia; being most of them found in Dvin (ancient city) and Gyumri. Most of these coins were silver coins.

Viceroys

Sasanian kings of Armenia

Marzbans of Armenia

References

Sources
 
 
 
 
 
 
 
 .
 .
 .

Further reading

See also
Timeline of Armenian history

 
Ancient Armenia
Provinces of the Sasanian Empire
States and territories established in the 430s
States and territories disestablished in the 7th century